Anthony J P Lombard LL.B., served as Mayor of Gibraltar from 1 August 2010 to 31 July 2011.

He is the honorary consul of the Republic of Poland in Gibraltar and the recipient of the Officer's Cross of the Order of Merit of the Republic of Poland.

References

Mayors of Gibraltar
Living people
Gibraltarian barristers
1953 births